Pandeleteius is a genus of broad-nosed weevils in the family Curculionidae. There are over 150 described species in Pandeleteius, distributed across the Americas. Most species in the genus were described by Anne Howden.

Taxonomy 
The genus Pandeleteius was named for the first time by Carl Johan Schönherr in 1834, page 129. It belongs to the subfamily Entiminae, tribe Tanymecini.

Distribution 
Argentina, Bolivia, Brazil, Chile, Colombia, Ecuador, Paraguay, Peru, Venezuela; Costa Rica, El Salvador, Guatemala, Honduras, Mexico, Nicaragua, Panama; Dominica, Grenada, Guadeloupe, Jamaica, Saint Vincent; E Canada, USA

Species
 A complete list of species by subgenus can be found at: https://ukrbin.com/index.php?id=25255
 Pandeleteius attenuatus Howden, 1959
 Pandeleteius buchanani Howden, 1959
 Pandeleteius cinereus (Horn, 1876)
 Pandeleteius defectus Green, 1920
 Pandeleteius dentipes Pierce, 1913
 Pandeleteius henryi Howden, 1959
 Pandeleteius hilaris (Herbst, 1797)
 Pandeleteius longicollis Champion, 1911
 Pandeleteius nodifer Champion, 1911
 Pandeleteius plumosiventris Howden, 1959
 Pandeleteius robustus (Schaeffer, 1908)
 Pandeleteius rotundicollis (Fall, 1907)
 Pandeleteius simplarius (Fall, 1907)

References

Further reading

 
 
 
 

 Howden AT (1959) A revision of the species of Pandeleteius Schonherr and Pandeleteinus Champion of America north of Mexico (Coleoptera: Curculionidae). Proceedings of the California Academy of Science 29: 361–421. https://biodiversitylibrary.org/page/15657419. 
 Howden AT (1974) The Pandeleteius subgenus Exmenetypus Voss in Central America (Coleoptera: Curculionidae, Tanymecini). The Coleopterists Bulletin 28: 7–16. https://www.jstor.org/stable/3999528. 
 Howden AT (1976) Pandeleteius of Venezuela and Colombia (Curculionidae: Brachyderinae: Tanymecini). Memoirs of the American Entomological Institute 24: 1–310. 
 Howden AT (1986) The Pandeleteius armatus group, with description of a new species from Mexico (Coleoptera: Curculionidae). The Coleopterists Bulletin 40: 317–323. https://www.jstor.org/stable/4008295.
 Howden AT (1996) Neotropical Pandeleteius (Coleoptera: Curculionidae) with irregular elytral striae. The Canadian Entomologist 128: 877–955. https://doi.org/10.4039/Ent128877-5
 Howden AT (1998) Review of the Pandeleteius biseriatus species-group (Coleoptera: Curculionidae), with description of a new species. The Canadian Entomologist 130: 367–375. https://doi.org/10.4039/Ent130367-3
 Howden AT (2001) A new species of Pandeleteius from Peru (Coleoptera, Curculionidae). Revue Française d’Entomologie (N. S.) 23: 171–175. 
 Howden AT (2004) Review of the genus Pandeleteius (Coleoptera: Curculionidae) of northern South America and the Lesser Antilles. The Canadian Entomologist 136: 181–231. https://doi.org/10.4039/n03-075
 Howden AT (2008) The species of Pandeleteius Schoenherr of coastal Chile and Peru (Coleoptera, Curculionidae). Zootaxa 1773: 55–62. https://doi.org/10.11646/zootaxa.1773.1.5
 Howden AT (2011) On some species of Pandeleteius Schoenherr, 1834, in South America south of the tenth parallel (Coleoptera, Curculionidae: Entiminae: Tanymecini). Zootaxa 2977: 50–60. https://doi.org/10.11646/zootaxa.2977.1.2

Entiminae